Shelley Watts (born 10 August 1987) is an Australian amateur boxer. Watts competed in the women's lightweight division at the 2014 Commonwealth Games where she won the gold medal. She was also a competitor in the 2012 AIBA Women's World Boxing Championships.

Watts qualified for the Rio 2016 Olympic Games, to be held in Rio de Janeiro 5–21 August on 31 March 2016 by making the final of the 2016 Asian and Oceanian Olympic qualifying event only to be eliminated in her first fight by  Italian teenager Irma Testa.

Watts is now a lawyer. She began her law degree three years before starting boxing.

Personal life
Watts is a supporter of the Australian football team South Sydney Rabbitohs.

References

External links
 

1987 births
Living people
People from the Mid North Coast
Australian women boxers
Lightweight boxers
Boxers at the 2014 Commonwealth Games
Commonwealth Games gold medallists for Australia
Boxers at the 2016 Summer Olympics
Olympic boxers of Australia
Commonwealth Games medallists in boxing
Sportswomen from New South Wales
Medallists at the 2014 Commonwealth Games